Iñigo Larrainzar Santamaría (born 5 June 1971) is a Spanish retired footballer who played mainly as a right back.

Also a central defender on occasion, his older brother Domingo, often referred to as Larrainzar I, was also a footballer, and both played at Osasuna.

Club career
A product of hometown CA Osasuna's youth academy and reserve team, where he played alongside future Athletic Bilbao teammate José Mari García, Pamplona-born Larrainzar made his first-team – and La Liga – debut on 21 March 1990 in a 0–1 away loss to Rayo Vallecano, and was definitely promoted to the main squad for the following season; aged 19, he was instrumental, as was brother Domingo, in helping the Navarrese side finish fourth and qualify for the UEFA Cup.

In the summer of 1993, Athletic Bilbao paid 200 million pesetas to acquire Larrainzar's services, then the second-highest figure by the club, and he was an undisputed starter in the campaigns to come. In 1997–98, alongside youth graduate Aitor Larrazábal who played on the opposite flank, he featured in 34 matches and scored two goals to help the Basques to a runner-up place, with direct qualification to the UEFA Champions League.

After some years battling for first-choice status with younger Jesús María Lacruz, who also represented Osasuna (although they did not coincide), and also dealing with injuries, Larraínzar moved south for Córdoba CF in the second division, where he played a further two seasons. He retired at the age of 34, with 366 top level appearances to his credit.

International career
Larrainzar was capped once for Spain. On 19 January 1994, he played the entire 2–2 friendly match against Portugal in Vigo.

References

External links

1971 births
Living people
Footballers from Pamplona
Spanish footballers
Association football defenders
La Liga players
Segunda División players
Segunda División B players
CA Osasuna B players
CA Osasuna players
Athletic Bilbao footballers
Córdoba CF players
Spain youth international footballers
Spain under-21 international footballers
Spain under-23 international footballers
Spain international footballers
Basque Country international footballers